This is a list of monuments and memorials dedicated to the memory of the British politician Simon Milton.

Miscellaneous
A square in the Victoria district of London was named Sir Simon Milton Square on 27 September 2020 by Milton's civil partner, Robert Davis and Milton's mother, Ruth.

The Sir Simon Milton Westminster UTC, a University technical college was opened in September 2017 and named after Milton.

A memorial garden at Paddington Recreation Ground was dedicated to Milton in 2012. It had originally been shown at the Chelsea Flower Show in 2012, where it was the recipient of a silver medal.

Public art

References

Lists of monuments and memorials to politicians